Petrovo Selo is a village in the municipality of Kladovo, Serbia. According to the 2011 census results, the village has a population of 79 inhabitants.

References

Populated places in Bor District